Ekaterina "Katya" Igorevna Starshova (born 28 October 2001) is a Russian actress known for playing the role of Polina "Pugovka" Vasnetsova in the Russian sitcom Daddy's Daughters.

Early life
Katya Starshova was born on October 28, 2001 in Moscow. She currently participates in the Junior Ballet on Ice 'Aleko'. She represented Russia in an international dance competition in Paris and reached second place.

Acting career

In 2007, the then 6-year old Starshova was given the role of Polina "Pugovka" Vasnetsova in the Russian TV series Daddy's Daughters, alongside Andrei Leonov, Nonna Grishaeva, Miroslava Karpovich, Anastasia Sivaeva, Darya Melnikova and Elizaveta Arzamasova.

Starshova has also appeared in commercials and other TV shows. In 2009, she played Tanya in Black Lightning.

Filmography
 2007–2013: Daddy's Daughters TV series as Polina "Pugovka" Vasnetsova
 2007: Mermaid
 2009: Black Lightning as Tanya Maykova

References

External links
 
 http://persona.rin.ru/eng/view/f/0/36650/katia-starshova

2001 births
Living people
Russian child actresses
Russian television actresses
Russian film actresses
Actresses from Moscow